Patricia Healy is an American actress who was born in Egypt.  She began acting in 1991 as Charlene in the erotic made-for-television thriller film Sweet Poison, co-starring Steven Bauer. She was known for General Hospital (in the role of Tammy Carson from March 27, 1998, to July 28, 2000), Heat (1995) and The Bodyguard (1992).

Biography
She is a daughter of John and Herta Healy. She studied acting at the HB Studio in New York City.

Personal life
Healy married Sergio Terrazas Torres on July 3, 2003. They had no children.

Filmography

Film

Television

References

External links

Living people
American television actresses
American film actresses
20th-century American actresses
21st-century English actresses
20th-century English women
20th-century English people
21st-century American women
Year of birth missing (living people)